Haidar Ali, also credited as Hyder Ali and Haider Ali, is an Indian film and television actor and screenwriter. He acted in an early Doordarshan TV Serial Nukkad (1986–87) as Raja. Later, Haidar Ali  wrote the story of Ashutosh Gowarikar's historic film, Jodhaa Akbar (2008). He also had a cameo in the movie song Khwaja Mere Khwaja.

Personal life
Haidar Ali is the youngest son of actress and model Pramila (Esther Victoria Abraham) and actor Kumar (real name Syed Hasan Ali Zaidi, who appeared in Mughal-e-Azam, Shri 420, and Watan). Pramila acted in 30 films, including Ulti Ganga, Bijli, Basant and Jungle King and also became the first major woman film producer, with 16 films under her Silver Productions banner.

Career
Ali made his television debut with Nukkad  in 1986 in the role of Raja. The series was by Kundan Shah and Saeed Akhtar Mirza. This was followed by Circus (1989), directed by Aziz Mirza, where he played the role of Ringmaster. Also acting in the series were actor Shahrukh Khan and director Ashutosh Gowariker. Over the years, he has worked as a character actor, with director Aziz Mirza in Phir Bhi Dil Hai Hindustani (2000), Chalte Chalte (2003) and Kismat Konnection (2008); With Sudhir Mishra in Main Zinda Hoon (1988) and Khoya Khoya Chand (2007); and with his former co-actor Gowariker in Baazi (1995) and Jodhaa Akbar (2008), in the latter he was also the writer of the film and co-screenplay writer, and had a cameo role in the song Khwaja Mere Khwaja.

Filmography

Films

 Akriet (1981) (Marathi film)
 Saaransh (1984)
 Aaj (1987)
 Main Zinda Hoon (1988)
 Salim Langde Pe Mat Ro (1989) as Nathu Seth
Lapandav (1993)  (Marathi film) as Pawandutt
 Baazi (1995) as Inspector Damji
 Daayraa (1996) as Garage Owner
Sarkarnama (1998) (Marathi film) as Srivastav, Govt Office employee 
 Khoobsurat (1999)
 Phir Bhi Dil Hai Hindustani (2000) as Shahrukh's Father
 Love Ke Liye Kuch Bhi Karega (2001) as Dance master
 Chalte Chalte (2003) as Postman
 Khoya Khoya Chand (2007) as Michael
 Kismat Konnection (2008) as Mr. Bakshi
 Shortkut (2009) as Film Director
 Trump Card (2009)
 File 25 (2010)

Television
 Nukkad (1986–87) as Raja
 Circus (1989) as Ringmaster
 Filmi Chakkar (1993) as RameshBhai, Director,  (Episode No 8) Guest Role
 Aahat (1995) Season 1(1995-2001)-  Episode 92-93 The Call, Episode 116-117 Tasveer- Painter Vidhyadhar

References

External links
 
 

Living people
Male actors in Hindi cinema
Indian male film actors
Indian male television actors
Indian male screenwriters
Indian people of Iraqi-Jewish descent
21st-century Indian actors
Year of birth missing (living people)